Johannes Quasten (3 May 1900 in Homberg – 10 March 1987 in Freiburg im Breisgau) was a Roman Catholic theologian and scholar of patristics.

Life 
Johannes Quasten (3 May 1900 in Homberg – 10 March 1987 in Freiburg im Breisgau) was a Roman Catholic theologian and scholar of patristics. 

He studied Roman Catholic theology at the Westfälische Wilhelms University (Wilhelm's University of Westphalia ) in Münster. In 1926 he was ordained priest. In 1927 he earned his graduate Degree with F.J. Dölger in Münster with a thesis on "Music and singing in the cults of the ancient pagan and early Christian times". Further studies followed in the years 1927-1929 in Rome at the Pontificio Istituto di Archeologia Cristiana. At the same time, he served as chaplain at the Campo Santo Teutonico or Teutonic Cemetery. He received a grant from the Association of German Science in the German Archaeological Institute in Rome and took part with the Gorres-Gesellschaft in international excavations. In 1931 he qualified as a professor in Münster. 

After confrontations with the Nazi regime, he moved to Rome. Through the mediation of Clemens August Graf von Galen, and through the intercession of the Cardinal Pacelli (later Pope Pius XII.), he moved to the United States of America in 1938, joined the Catholic University of America in 1938 and progressed through its ranks until he retired in 1970. 

With his retirement in 1970, he was appointed Honorary Professor of Catholic Theology at the Faculty of the University of Freiburg in Breisgau.

Johannes Quasten Award 

The Catholic University of America, Washington D.C. offers a Johannes Quasten Award.

Awards and honours 

 1948 Visiting lecturer at the Abt-Herwegen Institute for Historical Liturgical Research (Maria Laach Abbey)
 1951 Member of the steering committee for the Patristic Conference at Oxford University
 1960 Cardinal Spellman Award of the Catholic Theological Association of America for his Verdienste auf dem Gebiet der Theologie
 1960 Papers and participation in the pontifical commission regarding sacred liturgy in preparation for the second Vatican Council invited by Pope John XXIII
 1960 Member of the Oxford Historical Society
 1964 Ernennung zum Consultor Consilii ad exsequendam Constitutionem de sacra Liturgia by Pope Paul VI

External links 
 
 

20th-century German Catholic theologians
Clergy from North Rhine-Westphalia
Patristic scholars
1900 births
1987 deaths
Catholic University of America faculty
German male non-fiction writers
Academic staff of the University of Münster